Petja Peltomaa (born 1971 in Ylöjärvi) is a Finnish screenwriter.

Peltomaa graduated with master's degree from the Department of Film Studies from University of Art and Design.

In August 2014 Peltomaa was appointed as the Head of Drama for Yellow Film & TV Oy production company. Peltomaa is one of the founding members of Finland's Screenwriter's Guild and was the guild's chairwoman in 2013 and 2014. In 2015 the guild awarded Peltomaa as the screenwriter of the year.

Peltomaa co-wrote television series Kimmo with Tommi Liski for which they received Venla-award for best writing in 2013. Peltomaa has also been nominated for best writing in years 2014, 2015 and 2016 for television drama series Nurses. 

Peltomaa lives in Helsinki. She has two daughters.

Selected filmography and TV credits
 Käenpesä (2004)
 Tukka auki (2008) – Head writer
 Pihalla (2009) – Co-written with Sanna Reinumäki
 Parasta aikaa (2009) – Head writer
 Vastaparit (2010) – Head writer
 Kimmo (2012) – Co-written with Tommi Liski
 Kerran viikossa (2013) – Head writer
 "Nurses" (2014–) – Head writer

References

External links
 
 

Living people
1971 births
Finnish television writers
Finnish screenwriters
Finnish women screenwriters